Julian Kristoffersen (born 10 May 1997) is a Norwegian professional footballer who plays as a forward for  club Virtus Verona, on loan from Salernitana.

Club career
Born in Horten, Kristoffersen began his career in Norway with Ørn-Horten, before signing with Danish club FC Copenhagen in 2013.

He signed a three-year contract with Swedish club Djurgården in August 2017. He returned to Denmark in June 2018, signing a three-year contract with Hobro.

On 8 March 2020, Hobro confirmed that they had sold Kristoffersen to South Korean club Jeonnam Dragons.

On 2 February 2021, he signed a three-and-a-half-year contract with Italian Serie B club Salernitana.

For 2021–22 season, Salernitana was promoted to Serie A and Kristoffersen made one appearance in the top tier, before he joined Cosenza in Serie B on a season-long loan on 31 August 2021.

On 19 January 2023, Kristoffersen was loaned to Virtus Verona in Serie C for the rest of the season.

International career
Kristoffersen has represented Norway at youth international levels, at under-16, under-17, under-18 and under-21 levels.

Career statistics

Club

References

External links

1997 births
People from Horten
Sportspeople from Vestfold og Telemark
Living people
Norwegian footballers
Association football forwards
Norway youth international footballers
Norway under-21 international footballers
Danish Superliga players
Allsvenskan players
Serie B players
K League 2 players
Serie A players
FK Ørn-Horten players
F.C. Copenhagen players
Djurgårdens IF Fotboll players
Hobro IK players
Jeonnam Dragons players
U.S. Salernitana 1919 players
Cosenza Calcio players
Virtus Verona players
Norwegian expatriate footballers
Norwegian expatriate sportspeople in Denmark
Expatriate men's footballers in Denmark
Norwegian expatriate sportspeople in Sweden
Expatriate footballers in Sweden
Norwegian expatriate sportspeople in South Korea
Expatriate footballers in South Korea
Norwegian expatriate sportspeople in Italy
Expatriate footballers in Italy